This is a list of listed buildings In Lolland Municipality, Denmark.

The list

483 Dannemare

4895 Errindlev

4900 Nakskov

4913 Horslunde

4930 Maribo

4941 Bandholm

4812 Harpelund

4920 Søllested

4943 Torrig L

4944 Fejø

4951 Nørreballe

4953 Vesterborg

4960 Holeby

4970 Rødby

Delisted buildings

References

External links

 Danish Agency of Culture

 
Lolland